Meredith Calhoun (1805 – March 14, 1869) was a planter and slaveholder, merchant, and journalist, known for owning some of the largest plantations in the Red River area north of Alexandria, Louisiana. His workers were enslaved African Americans. Calhoun played a major role in the inter-regional slave trade of the American South, acting as a broker for the purchase and sale of thousands of enslaved persons.

There have been reports dating to the 19th century that author Harriet Beecher Stowe based the character of Simon Legree in her novel Uncle Tom's Cabin (1852) on Calhoun. She depicted Legree as a cruel slave owner, and the character's name has become synonymous with greed and cruelty.

References 

1805 births
1869 deaths